Below are lists of the largest stars currently known, ordered by radius and separated into categories by galaxy. The unit of measurement used is the radius of the Sun (approximately ).

The angular diameters of stars can be measured directly using stellar interferometry. Other methods can use lunar occultations or from eclipsing binaries, which can be used to test indirect methods of finding stellar radii. Only a few useful supergiant stars can be occulted by the Moon, including Antares A (Alpha Scorpii A). Examples of eclipsing binaries are Epsilon Aurigae (Almaaz), VV Cephei, and V766 Centauri (HR 5171). Angular diameter measurements can be inconsistent because the boundary of the very tenuous atmosphere (opacity) differs depending on the wavelength of light in which the star is observed.

Uncertainties remain with the membership and order of the lists, especially when deriving various parameters used in calculations, such as stellar luminosity and effective temperature. Often stellar radii can only be expressed as an average or be within a large range of values. Values for stellar radii vary significantly in different sources and for different observation methods.

All the sizes stated in these lists have inaccuracies and may be disputed. The lists are still a work in progress and parameters are prone to change.

Caveats
Various issues exist in determining accurate radii of the largest stars, which in many cases do display significant errors. The following lists are generally based on various considerations or assumptions; these include:
 Stellar radii or diameters are usually derived only approximately using Stefan–Boltzmann law for the deduced stellar luminosity and effective surface temperature.
 Stellar distances, and their errors, for most stars, remain uncertain or poorly determined.
 Many supergiant stars have extended atmospheres, and many are within opaque dust shells, making their true effective temperatures and surfaces highly uncertain.
 Many extended supergiant atmospheres also significantly change in size over time, regularly or irregularly pulsating over several months or years as variable stars. This makes adopted luminosities poorly known and may significantly change the quoted radii.
 Other direct methods for determining stellar radii rely on lunar occultations or from eclipses in binary systems. This is only possible for a very small number of stars.
 Most distance estimates for red supergiants come from stellar cluster or association membership, because it is difficult to calculate accurate distances for red supergiants that are not part of any cluster or association.
 In these lists are some examples of extremely distant extragalactic stars, which may have slightly different properties and natures than the currently largest known stars in the Milky Way. For example, some red supergiants in the Magellanic Clouds are suspected to have slightly different limiting temperatures and luminosities. Such stars may exceed accepted limits by undergoing large eruptions or changing their spectral types over just a few months (or potentially years).

Lists

The following lists show the largest known stars based on the host galaxy.

Milky Way

Magellanic Clouds

M31 and M33

Other galaxies (within the Local Group)

Outside the Local Group

Notes

References

See also

External links
 Giant Stars An interactive website comparing the Earth and the Sun to some of the largest known stars
 Three largest stars identified BBC News
 What is the Biggest Star in the Universe? Universe Today

Hypergiants
Supergiants
Largest
Stars, largest
Largest stars